Gary John Fox (December 23, 1943 – December 8, 2022) was a Canadian politician in Ontario. He was a Progressive Conservative member of the Legislative Assembly of Ontario from 1995 to 1999.

Background
Fox was educated at the University of Guelph, and graduated from their Advanced Agriculture Leadership Program. He worked as a farmer after graduation, and became a senior partner in Fox Farms of Bloomfield, Ontario.

Politics
Fox served as a councillor on the Sophiasburgh township council and the Prince Edward County Regional Council, and was a reeve of Sophiasburgh.

He was elected to the Ontario legislature in the 1995 provincial election, defeating Liberal candidate Robert Gentile and incumbent New Democrat Paul Johnson by over 6,000 votes in the riding of Prince Edward—Lennox-South Hastings.  He served as a backbench supporter of Mike Harris's government for the next four years, and was chair of the PC Rural Caucus Advisory Committee.

Fox was upset by Liberal Ernie Parsons in the 1999 provincial election, losing by only 56 votes in the redistributed riding of Prince Edward—Hastings.  He sought the federal Conservative Party of Canada nomination in Prince Edward—Hastings for the 2004 federal election, but lost to Daryl Kramp.

Later life and death
Fox thereafter continued to be a leading farmer in Prince Edward County, where he was considered to be a skilled sheepbreeder, and an expert evaluator of sale cattle.

Fox died on December 8, 2022, at the age of 79.

References

External links
 

1943 births
2022 deaths
Canadian farmers
People from Prince Edward County, Ontario
Progressive Conservative Party of Ontario MPPs